Racket Busters is a 1938 film about crime in the trucking industry starring Humphrey Bogart and George Brent. The film was directed by Lloyd Bacon.

Plot summary
Attorney Hugh Allison (Walter Abel) is appointed Special Prosecutor to investigate and strike down gangster John "Czar" Martin's (Humphrey Bogart) racketeering scheme in the trucking industry. This is Martin's first step in controlling New York's produce market. However, Alison is unable to get testimony from witnesses because of Martin's brutal coercion. Denny Jordan (George Brent), a popular and influential trucker, refuses to join Martin's gang, and his truck is vandalized, causing Jordan to crash his truck on the side of a hill. To provide for his pregnant wife Nora (Gloria Dickson), Jordan robs Martin's office but is caught. Martin agrees to forgive him if he joins his "protective association". Jordan reluctantly complies. This allows the other truckers to also join Martin's corrupt organization, while Allison begins jailing witnesses who refuse to testify. Jordan's oldest friend, Pop Wilson (Oscar O'Shea), is murdered after testifying against Martin, and Jordan's partner, "Skeets" Wilson (Allen Jenkins), quits trucking and begins selling tomatoes. Although Jordan is arrested by Allison and his wife leaves him, he refuses to testify against Martin. In a move to control the entire produce market, Martin incites the truckers to go on strike, thereby causing a food shortage, until every commission merchant and produce dealer join his association. But, Wilson refuses Martin's  entreaties and is killed by his gang. Jordan then leads the truckers into breaking the strike, and a free-for-all breaks out between the truckers and the racketeers. Jordan defeats Martin in a hand-to-hand fight as the police arrive. Denny eventually testifies against Martin, leading to his conviction.

Cast
 Humphrey Bogart as John 'Czar' Martin  
 George Brent as Denny Jordan  
 Gloria Dickson as Nora Jordan  
 Allen Jenkins as 'Skeets' Wilson  
 Walter Abel as Hugh Allison  
 Henry O'Neill as Governor  
 Penny Singleton as Gladys Christie  
 Anthony Averill as Dave Crane, Martin's Henchman  
 Oscar O'Shea as Pop Wilson  
 Elliott Sullivan as Charlie Smith  
 Fay Helm as Mrs. Smith  
 Joe Downing as Joe Pender, Martin's Henchman  
 Norman Willis as Gus Hawkins, Martin's Henchman  
 Don Rowan as Cliff Kimball

Production 
The film was based on the prosecution of real-life trucking racketeering schemes in New York City during Thomas E. Dewey's campaign against organized crime in the 1930s. When the film was released in France, it was retitled Threat Over the City to avoid mistakenly promoting itself as a tennis film.

References

External links 
 
 
 
 

1938 films
1938 crime films
American black-and-white films
American crime films
1930s English-language films
Films directed by Lloyd Bacon
Films produced by Samuel Bischoff
Films scored by Adolph Deutsch
Films with screenplays by Robert Rossen
Trucker films
Warner Bros. films
Films about organized crime in the United States
1930s American films